The Clean Harbors 150 was a NASCAR Camping World Truck Series racing event at Knoxville Raceway in Iowa. The inaugural running of the race was on July 9, 2021, the first NASCAR national touring event to be held at the historic facility. This is the third dirt track that the Truck Series has raced at, with the first being Eldora Speedway and the second being the dirt iteration of Bristol Motor Speedway.

History

In 2013, the Camping World Truck Series raced the Eldora Dirt Derby at Eldora Speedway in NASCAR's first national touring series dirt track race since 1970; the event ran from 2013 to 2019, before being canceled in 2020 due to the COVID-19 pandemic, and then not renewed for 2021 as NASCAR shuffled its national touring series schedules.

On November 19, 2020, NASCAR revealed the 2021 Camping World Truck Series schedule, which featured two dirt-track events, one being the Pinty's Dirt Truck Race at Bristol Motor Speedway in March, and the other at Knoxville Raceway in Iowa, a historic one-half-mile dirt oval track that began competition in 1901 and is best known for hosting the Knoxville Nationals sprint car championships, which led to the moniker "Sprint Car Capital of the World".

The event, scheduled to take place on July 9, has the NASCAR Camping World Truck Series anchoring the weekend's races, accompanied by the Brandt Professional Agriculture Corn Belt Clash for the United States Auto Club's AMSOIL National Sprint Car Series and the POWRi W.A.R. Sprint Car Series. The race, scheduled to run for 150 laps on the half-mile dirt track, is the first time an event sanctioned by one of NASCAR's national touring series – the NASCAR Cup Series, Xfinity Series, and Camping World Truck Series – has been held in the history of Knoxville Raceway. On June 25, 2021, the association of Iowa Chevrolet dealerships (Premier Chevy Dealers) was announced as the presenting sponsor of the 150-lap race.

In 2022, the race was moved from July (on the same weekend as the Cup and Xfinity Series races at Atlanta) to June (on the only off weekend of the year for the Cup Series and Xfinity Series off weekend). On April 29, 2022, Clean Harbors was announced as the race's title sponsor.

The race was removed from the schedule in 2023

Past winners

Notes
2021: The race was extended due to a NASCAR Overtime finish.

References

External links
 

NASCAR Truck Series races
 
Annual sporting events in the United States